

Hasdrubal the Bald (ʿAzrubaʿal, "Help of Baal") was a Carthaginian general in the Second Punic War. In 215 BCE, Hasdrubal was sent by Carthage to take the restive Roman territory of Sardinia, but his fleet was wrecked en route in a storm off the Balearic Islands. By the time he regrouped and arrived, Manlius Torquatus had largely pacified the territory, defeating Hiostus, son of the Sardinian leader Hampsicora, and was well-prepared against Hasdrubal's arrival. Manlius handily defeated the combined Carthaginian and Sardinian forces in the Battle of Decimomannu, in which Hasdrubal the Bald was captured.

See also
 Other Hasdrubals in Carthaginian history

References

Citations

Bibliography
 . 

Carthaginian commanders of the Second Punic War
Ancient Sardinia
3rd-century BC Punic people